The Transporter (Italian: La bisarca) is a 1950 Italian comedy science fiction film directed by Giorgio Simonelli and starring Peppino De Filippo, Silvana Pampanini, Lída Baarová and Aroldo Tieri. It is based on a radio program with the same name.

It was shot at the Farnesina Studios in Rome. The film's sets were designed by the art director Alberto Boccianti. It earned 182 and a half million lira at the Italian box office.

Synopsis
A barber is engaged to a manicurist working in the shop, but he grows jealous and picks a quarrel with one of the customers. Struck on the head he crashes into a radio playing a serial programme. Knocked unconscious he begins to have bizarre dreams about a deluge and a car transporter which functions as a Noah's Ark.

Production 
The film was based on the homonymous radio broadcast by Pietro Garinei and Sandro Giovannini, broadcast for two seasons from 1949 to 1951. A theatrical magazine was also taken from the radio broadcast, staged for the first time at the Sistina Theater in Rome. The film was shot in the Titanus studios at the Farnesina.

Cast 
 Peppino De Filippo as Toni La Motta 
 Lída Baarová as Greta 
 Clelia Matania as Dolores Garcia 
 Silvana Pampanini as Mirella 
 Aroldo Tieri as Alberto 
 Carlo Campanini as Salvador Garcia 
 Enrico Viarisio as Georges Durand 
 Kay Medford as Anna Paperiska  
 Maria Donati as Georges Durand's Wife
 Riccardo Billi as Noè 
 Franco Coop as Otto Krüger 
 Paul Muller as Complice di Anna Paperiska 
 Galeazzo Benti as  Cliente galante  
 Tino Buazzelli as  Dimitri 
 Arturo Bragaglia as Mayor
 Virgilio Riento as  Capo della banda di Arcachon 
 Vittorio Sanipoli as  Johnny 
 Nietta Zocchi as Cliente di La Motta 
 Bruno Corelli  
 Mario Siletti 
 Giulio Donnini 
 Franco Pesce

References

Bibliography
 Chiti, Roberto & Poppi, Roberto. Dizionario del cinema italiano: Dal 1945 al 1959. Gremese Editore, 1991.
 Gundle, Stephen. Fame Amid the Ruins: Italian Film Stardom in the Age of Neorealism. Berghahn Books, 2019.

External links

1950 films
1950s Italian-language films
Films directed by Giorgio Simonelli
1950s science fiction comedy films
Italian science fiction comedy films
Films with screenplays by Ruggero Maccari
Films based on radio series
1950s Italian films